Fonteyn is a crater on Mercury.  Its name was adopted by the IAU in 2012, after the English ballet dancer Margot Fonteyn.

The crater Munkácsy is to the southeast of Fonteyn.

References

Impact craters on Mercury